is a municipal university located in the city of Gifu, Gifu Prefecture, Japan. The predecessor of the school was founded in 1932, and it was chartered as a university in 1949.

International exchanges
The university has added to Gifu's sister city exchanges by becoming a sister university or setting up an academic exchange program with three of Gifu's sister cities: Hangzhou (China), Cincinnati (United States) and Florence (Italy). It has had a sister university agreement with Zhejiang University in Hangzhou since 1984. Since then, it has set up exchange programs with the pharmacy programs at the University of Cincinnati in Ohio and the University of Florence, which were started in 1991 and 1993, respectively. It also has had a relationship with China Pharmaceutical University since 1982.

External links
 Gifu Pharmaceutical University 
 Gifu Pharmaceutical University

References

Educational institutions established in 1932
Public universities in Japan
Buildings and structures in Gifu
Universities and colleges in Gifu Prefecture
1932 establishments in Japan